The Deseo Tour is the eleventh concert tour and the fourth world tour by Mexican recording artist Paulina Rubio, in support of her eleventh studio album, Deseo (2018). The tour officially began on June 8, 2019, in Santiago, Chile at the Gran Arena Monticelllo, and has confirmed dates in Mexico, Spain and the United States. According to Paulina, the tour is expected to visit more cities both in Europe and in Latin America.

Rubio previously performed at Sparks, NV, Primm, NV, and Indio, CA, on December, 2018, to promote the new album, as well as the upcoming North American leg of the tour, scheduled to begin in fall, 2019.

Set list
This set list represents the 8 June 2019 show at the Gran Arena Monticello in Chile. It does not represent all dates throughout the tour.

 "Mi Nuevo Vicio" 
 "Ni Una Sola Palabra"
 "Lo Haré Por Ti"
 "Todo Mi Amor"
 "Yo No Soy Esa Mujer"
 "El Último Adiós"
 "Dame Otro Tequila"
 "Ni Rosas Ni Juguetes"
 "Baila Casanova"
 "Te Quise Tanto"
 "Suave y Sutil"
 "Sabor a Miel" (acustic)
 "Enamorada" (acustic)
 "Mío"
 "Nada Fue Un Error" 
 "Causa Y Efecto"

Encore
 "Ya No Me Engañas" 
 "Y Yo Sigo Aquí"

Tour dates

References

2019 concert tours